The SMF Automated People Mover  is an elevated automated people mover system at Sacramento International Airport in Sacramento, California.  The system opened on October 6, 2011, and is used to move passengers between Central Terminal B (landside) and Concourse B (airside). The system uses two Bombardier Innovia APM 100 vehicles operating as single cars on two separate parallel tracks.

References

Public transportation in California
Transportation in Sacramento, California
Airport people mover systems in the United States
Innovia people movers
Railway lines opened in 2011